is a police station in Kōtō, Tokyo. It is operated by the Tokyo Metropolitan Police Department.

History
In early 2004, as Tokyo's Wangan area rapidly developed, the creation of a new police station was brought up. In June 2005, the TMPD confirmed a new station would be constructed.

The tentative name during the 2005 plan was "Rinkō Police Station". However, with the popularity of the Bayside Shakedown franchise, which centers around the "Wangan Police Station", it was decided that one of the possible names for the station would also be "Wangan Police Station". A survey for local residents to name the new station was overwhelming in favor of "Wangan Police Station" (湾岸署). Since "Wangan Police Station" is a copyrighted term by Fuji Television, the TMPD added "Tokyo" before to avoid issues. On June 27, 2007, the official name of the police station was confirmed to be "Tokyo Wangan Police Station."

In February 2008, construction of the police station was finished. The station opened on March 31, 2008.

References

External links
Official site 

Police stations in Japan
Buildings and structures in Koto, Tokyo